Til Kumar Menyangbo Limbu is a Nepalese politician, belonging to the Communist Party of Nepal (Unified Marxist-Leninist). He was elected to the Pratinidhi Sabha in the 1999 election.

References

Living people
Communist Party of Nepal (Unified Marxist–Leninist) politicians
Year of birth missing (living people)
Nepal MPs 1999–2002
Members of the Provincial Assembly of Koshi Province